"Ride" is the second single from Australian band the Vines' second album, Winning Days (2004). It reached the top 50 in Australia and the United Kingdom, as well as on the US Billboard Modern Rock Tracks chart. In Australia, the song was ranked  94 on Triple J's Hottest 100 of 2004.

Music video
The "Ride" music video, directed by Michel Gondry, shows the band playing by themselves in a hall. When they get to the chorus, bands appear from everywhere, helping them sing and play.

Track listings

Charts

Release history

References

External links
 "Ride" music video

2004 singles
2004 songs
Capitol Records singles
Heavenly Recordings singles
Music videos directed by Michel Gondry
Songs written by Craig Nicholls
The Vines (band) songs